The knockout stage of the 2015 CONCACAF Gold Cup began on 18 July 2015 and ended with the Final on 26 July 2015, to decide the champions of the 2015 CONCACAF Gold Cup. A total of eight teams competed in the knockout stage.

Qualified teams
The top two placed teams from each of the three groups, plus the two best-placed third teams, qualified for the knockout stage.

Bracket
In the knockout stage, the eight teams played a single-elimination tournament, with the following rules:
In the quarter-finals, teams from the same group could not play each other.
In all matches, if tied after 90 minutes, 30 minutes of extra time were played. If still tied after extra time, a penalty shoot-out was used to determine the winner.

Scores after extra time are indicated by (a.e.t.), and penalty shoot-out are indicated by (pen.).

All times EDT (UTC−4).

Quarter-finals

United States vs Cuba

Haiti vs Jamaica

Trinidad and Tobago vs Panama

Mexico vs Costa Rica

Semi-finals

United States vs. Jamaica

Panama vs. Mexico

Third place play-off

Final

Notes

References

External links
 

Knockout stage